John McKeown Snow Williams (August 13, 1818 – March 19, 1886) was a member of the United States House of Representatives from Massachusetts.

Biography
Born in Richmond, Virginia, Williams moved to Boston, Massachusetts. He attended the public schools, and engaged in the mercantile and shipping business as a partner in the packet shipping firm Glidden & Williams, which operated clippers between Boston and San Francisco.  He later became involved in other business ventures, including the Union Pacific Railroad.

He was a member of the Massachusetts Emigrant Aid Society in 1854.  (The Emigrant Aid Society financed the settlement in Kansas Territory of farmers opposed to slavery as an attempt to prevent Kansas from being settled by slave owners.)  Williams served as member of the Massachusetts House of Representatives in 1856, and the Massachusetts State Senate in 1858.

Williams was elected as a Republican to the Forty-third Congress (March 4, 1873 – March 3, 1875). He was defeated for reelection in 1874 to the Forty-fourth Congress, and resumed his former business pursuits.

He died in Cambridge, Massachusetts, March 19, 1886, and was interred in Mount Auburn Cemetery.

Notes

References

1818 births
1886 deaths
Burials at Mount Auburn Cemetery
Republican Party members of the Massachusetts House of Representatives
Republican Party Massachusetts state senators
Republican Party members of the United States House of Representatives from Massachusetts
19th-century American politicians